Bridge Castle is an L-plan castle, dating from the 16th century, standing on a rocky site  north west of Bathgate  in West Lothian, Scotland, on the west of the Barbauchlaw Burn. The former name of the castle was Little Brighouse.

History

The castle was sold by Alexander Stewart of Scotstounhill to William Livingstone, 6th Lord Livingston in 1588. Lord Livingston probably added the castle wing.  After the Livingstones supported the Jacobite rising of 1715 they forfeited their land and titles. The Hopes acquired the property which remains in their possession.  The architect James Maitland Wardrop altered the property internally and enlarged it to form a Victorian mansion. The building was listed at category B in 1971, at which time it was a hotel.

Structure

The castle was a rectangular building, three storeys and a garret high. A wing with crow-stepped gables was added to form the L-plan.  The parapet of the original tower was bridged across a recessed lintel as link to the new wing.  The first storey is vaulted, while other storeys have been modernised.  There is a stair tower in the re-entrant angle, round, but corbelled to square above.  There is a new entrance through a pedimented  Gothic porch.

References

Castles in West Lothian
Category B listed buildings in West Lothian
Listed castles in Scotland